The men's 110 metres hurdles event at the 1972 Summer Olympics in Munich was held from 3–7 September. Thirty-nine athletes from 27 nations competed. The maximum number of athletes per nation had been set at 3 since the 1930 Olympic Congress. The event was won by Rod Milburn of the United States, the nation's ninth of nine consecutive victories and the 15th overall gold medal in the event for the Americans. Guy Drut's silver was France's first medal in the event and the best result by a non-American since 1936.

Background

This was the 17th appearance of the event, which is one of 12 athletics events to have been held at every Summer Olympics. Two finalists from 1968 returned: gold medalist Willie Davenport of the United States and sixth-place finisher Bo Forssander of Sweden. Davenport's countryman Rod Milburn was the "heavy favorite" entering the season, however. He had won 27 consecutive finals and set the world record in the 120 yards version of the race going into the U.S. Olympic trials, where he hit two early hurdles and nearly missed the team, coming in third to Tom Hill and Davenport.

The Bahamas and Senegal each made their first appearance in the event; East Germany made its first appearance as a separate nation. The United States made its 17th appearance, the only nation to have competed in the 110 metres hurdles in each Games to that point.

Competition format

The competition continued to use the three-round format used since 1908 (except 1960, which had four rounds) and eight-man semifinals and finals, as well as the "fastest loser" system, used since 1964. The first round consisted of five heats, with 7 or 8 hurdlers each. The top three hurdlers in each heat, along with the next fastest overall, advanced to the semifinals. The 16 semifinalists were divided into two semifinals of 8 hurdlers each; the top four hurdlers in each advanced to the 8-man final.

Records

These were the standing world and Olympic records (in seconds) prior to the 1972 Summer Olympics.

In the final, Rod Milburn ran the hurdles in 13.24 seconds. This was recognized as equivalent to the standing hand-timed world record of 13.2 seconds, and was a new Olympic record. When the IAAF moved to keeping records based on auto-timed results in 1977, Milburn's performance was the best to that date and was recognized as the world record.

Schedule

All times are Central European Time (UTC+1)

All three rounds were on separate days for the first time.

Results

Round 1

The top three runners in each of the five heats, and the next fastest, advanced to the semifinal round.

Heat 1

Heat 2

Heat 3

Heat 4

Heat 5

Semifinals

The top four in each of the two heats advanced to the final.

Semifinal 1

Semifinal 2

Final

References

External links
Official report

Men's 110 metres hurdles
Sprint hurdles at the Olympics
Men's events at the 1972 Summer Olympics